The actuarial control cycle is a specific business activity which involves the application of actuarial science to real world business problems. The actuarial control cycle requires a professional within that field (i.e., an actuary) to specify a problem, develop a solution, monitor the consequences thereof, and repeat the process. The Society of Actuaries in the US is increasingly integrating the actuarial control cycle into the examination/qualification process as a framework that helps to define actuarial projects.

References

Actuarial science